Agafa is an old and uncommon Russian female first name. It is derived from the Greek word agathē, meaning kind, good. It can also be a variant of the name Agafiya. The name was included into various, often handwritten, church calendars throughout the 17th–19th centuries, but was omitted from the official Synodal Menologium at the end of the 19th century.

The diminutives of "Agafa" are Agafochka, Gafa, and Aga.

References

Notes

Sources
Н. А. Петровский (N. A. Petrovsky). "Словарь русских личных имён" (Dictionary of Russian First Names). ООО Издательство "АСТ". Москва, 2005. 
А. В. Суперанская (A. V. Superanskaya). "Словарь русских имён" (Dictionary of Russian Names). Издательство Эксмо. Москва, 2005. 


Given names of Greek language origin